The 1924–25 Washington State Cougars men's basketball team represented Washington State College for the  college basketball season. Led by seventeenth-year head coach Fred Bohler, the Cougars were members of the Pacific Coast Conference and played their home games on campus in Pullman, Washington.

References

External links
Sports Reference – Washington State Cougars: 1924–25 basketball season

Washington State Cougars men's basketball seasons
Washington State Cougars
Washington State
Washington State